Romeo is an unincorporated community in Greene County, Tennessee, United States. Romeo is located in Northern Greene County along Tennessee State Route 70, just north of Interstate 81 exit 30.

Notes

Unincorporated communities in Greene County, Tennessee
Unincorporated communities in Tennessee